The 1942 United States Senate election in Wyoming was held on November 3, 1942. Democratic Senator Harry Schwartz ran for re-election to his second term. He was challenged by businessman Edward V. Robertson, who emerged from a close and hotly contested Republican primary as the narrow winner. Aided in part by the national swing toward Republicans in 1942, Robertson defeated Schwartz for re-election by a decisive margin.

Democratic primary

Candidates
 Harry Schwartz, incumbent U.S. Senator

Results

Republican Primary

Candidates
 Edward V. Robertson, businessman
 Arthur G. Crane, former President of the University of Wyoming
 Tim McCoy, actor
 Walter A. Muir, former Mayor of Rock Springs
 Ralph R. Crow, former State Representative, 1940 Republican candidate for the U.S. Senate
 Alonzo M. Clark, former Governor of Wyoming

Results

General election

Results

References

Wyoming
1942
1942 Wyoming elections